Campeonato Nacional de Fútbol de Puerto Rico is an amateur football league in Puerto Rico. As of 2008 it has been replaced as the highest level football league in the country by the Puerto Rico Soccer League. It was created in 2005 by the Federación Puertorriqueña de Fútbol to unify the domestic football scene (but only managed to get the attention of Liga Mayor teams, whilst most teams chose to stay in La Liga Premier, another amateur league). It does not include the Puerto Rico Islanders, who for historical reasons played in the United Soccer Leagues, the second division in the United States of America and Canada.

2005 season 
Campeonato Nacional de Fútbol de Puerto Rico, became the first organised tournament to unify the domestic football scene established by the Federación Puertorriqueña de Fútbol. 2 groups of 8 teams participated:

Tables

Third-place match

Final
Location: Estadio Juan Ramón Loubriel, Bayamón

Campeonato Nacional de Fútbol de Puerto Rico - 2007
Fraigcomar
San Juan Galaxy
Caguas Huracán
San Francisco Guaynabo
Clube Atlético Levittown
Tornados de Humacao

Previous winners

2005 : Fraigcomar (Rio Piedras)
2006 : Fraigcomar (Rio Piedras)
2007 : Fraigcomar (Rio Piedras)

References

External links
 Puerto Rico - List of Champions, RSSSF.com

Defunct football leagues in Puerto Rico

it:Campionato portoricano di calcio